Evan Stamer (born 2001) is an American racing driver. He currently competes in the World Racing League (WRL) driving for Ruckus Racing and previously competed in The Road to Indy U.S. F2000 National Championship for Ignite Autosport with Cape Motorsports.

Racing record

Career summary

Motorsports career results

American open-wheel racing results

U.S. F2000 National Championship 
(key) (Races in bold indicate pole position) (Races in italics indicate fastest lap) (Races with * indicate most race laps led)

References 

2001 births
Living people
Racing drivers from Illinois
U.S. F2000 National Championship drivers